Painted Lady was a 1997 murder mystery drama starring Helen Mirren, involving art theft. It co-starred Franco Nero, Karl Geary and Iain Glen, and was directed by Julian Jarrold.

The role was created specifically for Mirren, as a means for her to try something a bit different from her Inspector Tennison character on the popular Prime Suspect series.  The series was a collaborative effort of Granada Television and PBS. It was broadcast on ITV from 7 to 8 December 1997 in the UK and in the US on PBS's Masterpiece Theatre 26 April 1998.

Plot summary
Maggie Sheridan, a washed-up blues vocalist from the 1960s who had long since stopped performing, had settled into a comfortable life on the Dublin estate of Sir Charles Stafford, the father of her childhood friend. When Sir Charles is murdered in what appears to be a bungled robbery (in which a valuable sixteenth-century painting is stolen), Maggie is drawn into the world of illegal art trade in an effort to solve the mystery and avenge her friend's murder, donning the persona of Polish Countess Magdelena Kreschinskaá.

The story centres around Judith Beheading Holofernes, the masterwork of Artemisia Gentileschi, who was a 17th-century female Italian painter who survived a rape. The painting fictionally travels to Dublin and New York City, and Gentileschi's tragic story eventually figures into the plot. There are other visual references to notable paintings in the film.

Cast
 Helen Mirren as Maggie Sheridan

 Iain Glen as Sebastian Stafford
 Franco Nero as Robert Tassi
 Michael Maloney as Oliver Peel
 Lesley Manville as Susie Peel
 Iain Cuthbertson as Charles Stafford
 Barry Barnes as D. S. Fagan
 Michael Liebmann as Bryan Gavin
 John Kavanagh as Michael Longley

Gallery
Paintings featured:

References

External links
 

1997 British television series debuts
1997 British television series endings
1990s British drama television series
ITV television dramas
1990s British crime television series
1990s British mystery television series
1990s British television miniseries
Television series by WGBH
Television series by ITV Studios
Television shows produced by Granada Television
English-language television shows
Television shows set in the Republic of Ireland
Artemisia Gentileschi